Vankeeria is a genus of spiders in the family Liocranidae. First described in 2012 by Bosselaers, it contains only one species , Vankeeria catoptronifera, found in Greece.

References

Liocranidae
Monotypic Araneomorphae genera